London Drugs Limited is a Canadian retail pharmacy chain based in Richmond, British Columbia. As of June 2021, the chain has 78 stores in the provinces of British Columbia, Alberta, Saskatchewan, and Manitoba. In addition to pharmacy services, London Drugs locations also sell electronics, housewares, cosmetics, and a limited selection of grocery items.

History 
London Drugs was founded by Sam Bass in 1945 as a small drugstore at 800 Main Street in Vancouver, British Columbia. Bass named his drugstore after the English city of London, the seat of the Canadian monarch.

In 1968, London Drugs was sold to Daylin, Inc. The next year, Daylin ran into financial difficulties in the US branch of its business, and decided to put London Drugs up for sale. In 1976, the business was acquired by the H.Y. Louie Group under the direction of President Tong Louie.

Tong Louie expanded the company within BC and, for the first time, beyond the provincial border into Alberta with the first Edmonton location in 1976. In the next ten years, London Drugs tripled its number of stores.

During this growth, the company also began increasing the types of products available in stores. Small kitchen appliances, high end cosmetics and high quality photo equipment quickly became staple items lining the shelves.

In 1981, London Drugs expanded into another non-traditional drugstore category by installing its first One-Hour Photofinishing labs. The introduction of photofinishing labs into the store and the one-hour-photo revolution paved the way for London Drugs' introduction of a computer department in 1983.

In 2004, the St. Vital Shopping Centre in Winnipeg became the new home to London Drugs' first (and still only) Manitoba store.

Today, London Drugs has stores in more than 35 major markets throughout British Columbia, Alberta, Saskatchewan, and Manitoba. According to their website, as of September 2019, they operate 82 stores. In addition to pharmacy, other major goods offered include cosmetics, small appliances, electronics, cameras and photo finishing, toys and food. London Drugs serves more than 45 million customers each year.

In January 2019, London Drugs acquired the Edmonton-based photography chain, McBain Camera.

Brands 
London Drugs markets its own brand of products and services under the following labels:

Locations 
Of the chain's 78 stores, most are located in British Columbia, 37 of them in Vancouver and the surrounding area. There are also 20 stores in Alberta, 5 in Saskatchewan, and 1 in Manitoba.

References

External links 
 

1945 establishments in British Columbia
 
Consumer electronics retailers of Canada
Canadian pharmacy brands
Department stores of Canada
Canadian companies established in 1945
Retail companies established in 1945
Companies based in Richmond, British Columbia
Privately held companies of Canada